The 1914 Copa de Competencia Jockey Club was the final that decided the champion of the 8th. edition of this National cup of Argentina. In the match, held in Racing Club Stadium in Avellaneda on November 15, 1914, River Plate defeated Rosarian club Newell's Old Boys 4–0.

It was the first official title won by River Plate in the top division of Argentine football.

Qualified teams 

Note

Overview 
The 1914 edition was contested by 15 clubs, 14 within Buenos Aires Province and 1 from Liga Rosarina de Football (Newell's Old Boys) that entered directly to the final. River Plate reached the final after beating Belgrano A.C. (5–1 in group of 16), San Isidro (1–1, 2–1 in playoff), Ferro Carril Oeste (2–1 in quarter final) and Racing (2–1 in semifinal).

Match details

Notes

References

Club Atlético River Plate matches
Newell's Old Boys matches
1914 in Argentine football
Football in Avellaneda